is a Japanese baseball pitcher who is currently a free agent. He has played in Nippon Professional Baseball (NPB) for the Orix Buffaloes.

Career
Orix Buffaloes selected Tohmei with the second selection in the 2013 Nippon Professional Baseball draft.

On March 29, 2014, Tohmei made his NPB debut.

On December 2, 2020, he become a free agent.

References

External links

NPB.com

1989 births
Living people
Baseball people from Gifu Prefecture
Japanese baseball players
Nippon Professional Baseball pitchers
Orix Buffaloes players
Toin University of Yokohama alumni